Bad Staffelstein is a small town in the Bavarian Administrative Region of Upper Franconia in Germany. It has around 10,000 inhabitants.

Bad Staffelstein is known for several landmarks, such as the Basilica of the Vierzehnheiligen designed by Balthasar Neumann, the former monastery of Banz Abbey, now Banz Castle, and the 540 meter high Staffelberg. Most recently, it has been the thermal salt water spa, for which the town received the title Bad (spa) in 2001, that has made Staffelstein a tourist attraction.

Geography

Location
The municipal territory of Bad Staffelstein extends on both banks of the Main river. It is located northeast of Bamberg in the district of Lichtenfels.

Subdivisions
Bad Staffelstein consists of the following Stadtteile:

History
Staffelstein was first mentioned around 800 and received its town status in 1130.

In 1846, with the construction of the Ludwig South-North Railway, the town was connected to the Bavarian rail network.

The status of spa was awarded in 2001.

Stadtteile (quarters)

Kaider
Kaider is known for its stone industry, as well as for St. Mary's Chapel.

Kaider was earlier known as Dabermannsdorf; the change to the name Kaider has been proven to have taken place no later than 1542.

Kaider was first mentioned on 12 December 1299. On that day, Albert von Giech, knight of Bamberg, sold with the agreement of his wife Elisabeth and his brother Kunimund, a canon of Bamberg Cathedral, all of his lands in Nuweseze (Neuses am Main), Obristfeld, and Dabermannsdorf (now Kaider) to Langheim Abbey. The selling price was 126 Pfund Bamberg Denars.

Schwabthal
Schwabthal lies 7 km east of Bad Staffelstein and has around 200 residents.

Incorporation
The District Reform of 1972 brought many changes to Staffelstein. Except for the District Office all other central administrations were dissolved. With the Municipal Territory Reform in 1978, the loss of administrative power and centrality became more balanced.

Demographics
1900: 1,724
1977: 4,985 (before the Municipal Territory Reform)
1978: 9,881 (after the Municipal Territory Reform)

Culture and landmarks

Museums
Museum of the town of Bad Staffelstein
Fossil Collection at Banz Castle

Buildings
On 5 July 1684, a fire destroyed almost the entire town center. Therefore, most houses in Staffelstein today date from after the fire.
 The town hall (built from 1684 to 1687), is a three-story Franconian half-timbered house and dominates the town's market square.
 The Bamberg Tower (commonly referred to as the Stadtturm) is the only remaining tower from the town fortifications. For some time, it has been used to exhibit art.
 Banz Abbey and castle
 Basilica of the Vierzehnheiligen

Regular Events
Staffelsteiner Autofrühling (March)
Songs an einem Sommerabend (July)
Altstadtfest (End of July)
Beerbrewerfest  (Assumption of Mary, 15th of August)
Obermain-Marathon (April)

Sports
 TSV 1860 Staffelstein

Notable people
 Adam Riese (1492–1559), mathematician
His arithmetic books were used for instruction in schools well into the 18th century. Even today, one hears the German expression "Das macht nach Adam Ries(e)..." ("According to Adam Ries, that gives us...").

  (1855-1929), teacher and educational writer
  (1920-2013), painter and sculptor

References

The information in this article is based on a translation of its German equivalent.

Further reading

Antiquarian
Heinrich Karl, Staffelsteiner Chronik. Staffelstein 1905.

Modern
 Karl-Ludwig Ostertag-Henning,  Der Apfelbaum im Gottesgarten. Staffelstein 1998, 
 Bildende Kunst in Staffelstein. Hrsg. vom Arbeitskreis Kunst der Kultur-Initiative Staffelstein. Volume 1. Staffelstein 2000, 
 Günter Dippold und Alfred Meixner (Hrsg.), Staffelsteiner Lebensbilder. Staffelstein 2000, 
 Günter Dippold, Bad Staffelstein. Kleinod im Gottesgarten am Obermain.  Stuttgart 2001, 
 Bildende Kunst in Staffelstein. Hrsg. vom Arbeitskreis Kunst der Kultur-Initiative Staffelstein. Volume 2. Bad Staffelstein 2002,

External links

 

Spa towns in Germany
Lichtenfels (district)
Populated places on the Main basin
Populated riverside places in Germany